The City of Merri-bek  is a local government area in metropolitan Melbourne, Australia. It comprises the inner northern suburbs between 4 and 11 kilometres from the Melbourne CBD.

The local government area was created as City of Moreland in 1994 during the amalgamations of local governments by the state government, being created from the former local government areas of the City of Brunswick, the City of Coburg and the southern part of the City of Broadmeadows. It was renamed to Merri-bek in September 2022.

In 2004 the Victorian Electoral Commission (VEC), an independent authority created under Victorian state legislation, conducted a representation review of the council's electoral structure, resulting in a recommendation that the 10 single councillor wards be replaced by three multi-councillor wards. A consequence of the change from single-councillor to multi-councillor wards was a change in election method from Instant runoff voting to proportional representation via Single transferable vote. Elections are held every four years.

Name
In November 2021, it came to the council's attention that Moreland's namesake was indirectly associated to a Jamaican plantation site that had traded slaves up to the 1800s. This historical information was contained in the 2010 Moreland Council publication Thematic History, and published in books and articles as far back as 1944.

In October 1839, Scottish surgeon and settler Dr Farquhar McCrae was sold land between Moonee Ponds Creek and Sydney Road by the Crown in the area's first colonial sale. McCrae gave the land the name Moreland, some suggest he may have named this after a Jamaican sugar plantation that McCrae's paternal grandfather Alexander McCrae worked at from the late 1760s to the early 1790s, which was involved in slave trading, and kept up to 500 to 700 enslaved people in the operation in any one year. Greens Mayor Mark Riley said "The history behind the naming of this area is painful, uncomfortable and very wrong. It needs to be addressed". In May 2022 a choice of three proposed names said to be derived from the Woi-wurrung language was announced by Riley and Uncle Andrew Gardiner, deputy chair of the Wurundjeri Woi-wurrung Cultural Heritage Aboriginal Corporation: Wa-dam-buk, meaning “renew”; Merri-bek, meaning “rocky country”; and Jerrang, meaning “leaf of tree”. The names were scheduled to be decided by July 2022 following community consultation.

The community consultation for the renaming commenced in May 2022 and ended June 2022. Some residents expressed dissatisfaction with the process resulting in a petition to council.

On 3 July 2022 (coinciding with the start of NAIDOC Week) the Council voted at a Special Council Meeting to officially endorse Merri-bek as the preferred name. The name was submitted to the Minister for Local Government for consideration and the Minister's decision to alter the name was gazetted on 13 September 2022 and came into operation on 26 September.

Council services
Merri-bek Council runs the Counihan Gallery at the Brunswick Town Hall, a free public art gallery named after the local artist, Noel Counihan. Other art events supported by Council include the MoreArt event, an art in public spaces show located along the Upfield transport corridor. The council also sponsors various street festivals around the municipality, the best known being the Sydney Road Street Party.

One of the highlights of the Merri-bek City Council is the public library. Merri-bek City Libraries has five branches.

Other services provided by Merri-bek Council include maternal and child health service, waste and recycling collection, parks and open space, a youth space called Oxygen, services for children, and aged services.

Climate action 
Merri-bek/Moreland Council has been one of the leading municipal councils in Australia in adopting policies on climate action and sustainability. A January 2020 Climateworks Australia local government report identified City of Moreland as one of 3 out of 57 municipal jurisdictions in Australia to have a "fully aligned net zero by 2050 target that addresses both operational and community emissions."

City of Merri-bek is a member of ICLEI – Local Governments for Sustainability, the Global Covenant of Mayors for Climate & Energy, the Cities Power Partnership, Climate Emergency Australia (CEA),
Climate Active, The Northern Alliance for Greenhouse Action (NAGA), and has declared pledges in the TAKE2 scheme with Sustainability Victoria.

Council declared a climate emergency on 12 September 2018.

Council operational emissions reduction
For operational emissions, Moreland Council was certified as a ‘carbon neutral’ council in 2012. This required purchase of carbon offset credits. Moreland was the second council in Victoria, and the third in Australia, to receive this certification. A target of 30% less emissions than 2011, with a stretch goal of 40% by 2020, was over-achieved with an emissions cut of 69% by 2020, which will reduce the carbon offsets required to be purchased.

Moreland City Council installed Victoria's first EV fast charge station in 2013. This has now grown to a network of 16 public EV charging stations around the municipality which are powered by 100% zero emissions renewable energy from the Crowlands Wind Farm, near Ararat.

In 2014, City of Moreland joined with the City of Melbourne and several other institutions and established the Melbourne Renewable Energy Project (MREP). This project developed and funded the construction of a purpose-built 39 turbine, 80 MW Crowlands windfarm, which started supplying 100% renewables power to Council facilities and buildings in 2019.

Net zero by 2040 community emissions target
Moreland's community wide municipal emissions in 2019 were 1,609,000 tonnes CO2e, composed of sectoral emissions of: Waste (3%), Transport (17%), Gas (21%), Electricity (59%).

The City of Merri-bek has set a community emissions reduction target of net zero emissions by 2040 and established the Moreland Zero Carbon 2040 Framework Strategy and the first 5-year action plan to achieve that target.

Climate related policies and strategies
Other key climate and sustainability policies and strategies driving climate action include: Climate Emergency Action Plan (2020 to 2025), Moreland Integrated Transport Strategy, Waste and Litter Strategy, Achieving zero Carbon in the Planning Scheme, Sustainable Buildings Policy, Urban Heat Island Effect Action Plan, Urban Forest Strategy, Watermap, Procurement policy, Cooling the Upfield Corridor Action Plan, Food Systems Strategy, Fossil Fuel Divestment Strategy, Moreland Nature Plan.

Climate action endorsements
During 2021 City of Moreland supported a climate disaster levy on coal exports, and endorsed the Fossil Fuel Non-Proliferation Treaty Initiative, the first government jurisdiction in Australia to do so.

Council

Current composition

Councillors are elected from three multi-member wards, two electing four members, and one electing three, for a total of eleven councillors. The current council was elected in October 2016, and its composition is:

In order of election by ward, is:

Mayors

The current Mayor is Angelica Panopoulos and the Deputy Mayor is Helen Davidson. They were elected by council in November 2022 and will serve the 2023 year.

Election results

2020 election results

Townships and localities
The 2021 census, the city had a population of 171,357 up from 162,558 in the 2016 census

^ - Territory divided with another LGA

Controversy 
In 2023, former Councillor Milad El-Halabi is set to face trial after being accused of stealing and forging votes in the last eletion. El-Halabi was a ward of the Moreland City, where over 80 ballots were reportedly forged. El-Halabi's wife, Diana, and daughter, Tania, have also been accused by the police.

Sister cities 
  Xianyang, Shaanxi, China
  Solarino, Italy
  Canterbury, New South Wales, Australia
  Aileu, East Timor
  Mansfield, Victoria, Australia
  Sparta, Greece

See also 
 List of Melbourne suburbs

Notes

References

External links 
 
 Official Merri-bek City Council website
 Moreland Online Community Directory
 List of Moreland's Friendship cities
 Moreland Community Profile: census information and demographics
 Metlink local public transport map
 Link to Land Victoria interactive maps
 Merri-bek City Libraries website

Local government areas of Melbourne
Greater Melbourne (region)